Free Democrats of Arjeplog was a local political party in Arjeplog, Sweden.

In the 2002 municipal polls it got 157 votes (8.0%) and three seats (down from four in 1998). The party forms part of a local government coalition consisting of the Social Democrats, Centre Party and AFD.

Swedish local political parties